The 2021 Rochdale Metropolitan Borough Council election took place on 6 May 2021 to elect members of Rochdale Borough Council in England. This was on the same day as other local elections. One-third of the seats were up for election.

Results

Ward results

Balderstone and Kirkholt

Bamford

Castleton

Central Rochdale

East Middleton

Healey

Hopwood Hall

Kingsway

Littleborough Lakeside

Milkstone and Deeplish

Milnrow and Newhey

Norden

North Heywood

North Middleton

Smallbridge and Firgrove

South Middleton

Spotland and Falinge

Wardle and West Littleborough

West Heywood

West Middleton

References 

Rochdale
Rochdale Council elections